Johannes Singhanmer (born 9 May 1953), is a German politician of the Christian Social Union (CSU). Between 2013 and 2017, he was one of the Vice-Presidents of the Bundestag.

Political career
Singhammer has been a member of the Christian Social Union since 1972. He was first elected to the German Bundestag in the 1994 federal elections, as representative of the Munich North constituency. He initially served on the Committee on Labour and Social Affairs as well as on the Committee on Family Affairs, Senior Citizens, Women and Youth.

In the negotiations to form a coalition government following the 2013 federal elections, Singhammer was part of the CDU/CSU delegation in the working group on health policy, led by Jens Spahn and Karl Lauterbach.

In July 2016, Singhammer announced that he would not stand in the 2017 federal elections but instead resign from active politics by the end of the parliamentary term.

By late 2017, Singhammer commissioned a comprehensive report on the right of Poland to demand reparations from Germany for World War II. German parliamentary legal experts later found any claims related to German crimes had become unfeasible at latest in 1990 when a treaty was signed by East and West Germany, France, the Soviet Union, the United Kingdom, and the United States ahead of German reunification.

Other activities

Regulatory bodies
 Federal Network Agency, Member of the Advisory Board (2005–2009)
 Regulatory Authority for Telecommunications and Posts (RegTP), Chairman of the Advisory Board (2002–2005)

Non-profits
 Hanns Seidel Foundation, Member
 Max Planck Institute of Psychiatry, Member of the Board of Trustees
 Deutsches Museum, Member of the Board of Trustees
 German-Mozambican Society, Member of the Advisory Board
 Haus der Geschichte, Member of the Board of Trustees (1998–2002)

References

1953 births
Living people
Members of the Bundestag for Bavaria
Politicians from Munich
Members of the Bundestag 2013–2017
Members of the Bundestag 2009–2013
Members of the Bundestag 2005–2009
Members of the Bundestag 2002–2005
Members of the Bundestag 1998–2002
Members of the Bundestag 1994–1998
Members of the Bundestag for the Christian Social Union in Bavaria